Neukamerun was the name of Central African territories ceded by the Third French Republic to the German Empire in 1911. Upon taking office in 1907, Theodor Seitz, governor of Kamerun, advocated the acquisition of territories from the French Congo. Germany's only major river outlet from its Central African possessions was the Congo River, and more territories to the east of Kamerun would allow for better access to that waterway.

France and Germany were rivals for Morocco, and in 1911, the Agadir Crisis broke out over the question of possession of that kingdom. France and Germany agreed to negotiate on 9 July 1911, and on 4 November, they signed the Treaty of Fez. France agreed to cede part of the French Congo to Germany in exchange for German recognition of France's rights to Morocco and a strip of land in northeastern Kamerun between the Logone and Chari rivers. The Kamerun colony grew from 465,000 km² to 760,000 km². Otto Gleim was governor of Kamerun at the time.  The expanded colony became known as Grand Kamerun.

The exchange sparked debate in Germany; opponents argued that the new territories presented little opportunity for commercial exploitation or other profit. The German colonial secretary eventually resigned over the matter.

During World War I, France was eager to regain the territories. In 1916, France seized the territories after the fall of German forces in western Africa. France took control of Cameroun as a League of Nations mandate (although it was not integrated into French Equatorial Africa). The boundary was placed back at its pre-1911 line and Neukamerun ceased to exist.  The territory today forms part of Chad, Central African Republic, the Republic of the Congo, and Gabon.

Notes

References 
 DeLancey, Mark W., and DeLancey, Mark Dike (2000). Historical Dictionary of the Republic of Cameroon (3rd ed.). Lanham, Maryland: The Scarecrow Press. .
 Hoffmann, Florian (2007). Okkupation und Militärverwaltung in Kamerun. Etablierung und Institutionalisierung des kolonialen Gewaltmonopols. Göttingen: Cuvillier. 
 Neba, Aaron (1999). Modern Geography of the Republic of Cameroon, 3rd ed. Bamenda: Neba Publishers. .
 Ngoh, Victor Julius (1996). History of Cameroon Since 1800. Limbé: Presbook. .
 Map of Kamerun

Kamerun
1911 in Morocco
States and territories established in 1911
States and territories disestablished in 1916
Former colonies in Africa
1911 establishments in Africa
1916 disestablishments in Africa